Noel McGrath (born 1949) is an Australian musician, journalist and author, whose best known publications are The Australian Encyclopaedia of Rock (1978) and Ultimate Success (1988).

Biography
Noel McGrath grew up in Mount Waverley, a suburb of Melbourne, and from the age of fourteen he played guitar. In 1963 he formed his first band, the Vampires, performing lead vocals and guitar, with John Harmer (drums), Doug Stevens (piano), Bill Stevens (guitar, bass) and Brad Stevens (saxophone). In 1965 he formed the Fugitives with Kelvin Monaghan (guitar), Chris Deutscher (drums) and Colin De Luca (bass), which was followed by the Shade in 1967 with John Sinclair (vocals), Phil Randall (drums) and John DeBoer (bass).

At the age of seventeen he adopted the stage name, Shane Harley, and formed the All Stars with Allan Sterling (keyboards), Penny Parsons (vocals), Wayne Duncan (bass), Stan Azzopardi (guitar), Ken Semple (saxophone) and Eddie Chappell (bass). They recorded a single with cover versions of "Come Dance with Me"/"Will You Love Me Tomorrow", on the Festival Label.

After completing year 12 he enrolled at Swinburne Institute of Technology where he graduated with a Degree of Business Studies. During this period he continued to perform with a variety of pop, rock bands, including the Shane Harley Trio, Grand Slam and the Paul McKay Sound.

In October 1978 his first commercially successful book, The Australian Encyclopaedia of Rock, was published by Outback Press. His first book led to a career in radio (Gold FM, KIIS FM and 3MP) and television (Peter Couchman Show on the Ten Network) as a rock historian. This was followed by Australian Encyclopaedia of Rock 1978-79 Yearbook (1979) and Australian Encyclopaedia of Rock & Pop (1984). Andrew Ferrington of The Canberra Times described the second edition, which "lists every Australian band and performer who recorded songs that reached the national top-40 singles or top-20 albums charts... The listings are thorough and faultless, as far as I can ascertain, but like Glenn A. Baker's book, this book falls into the 'catalogue' variety of literature on the subject."

McGrath worked as a Communications Manager for the Australian Bicentennial Authority between 1986 and 1989. In November 1988 he released, Ultimate Success on Paradise Publications, a change of direction from music to the field of personal development. It provided McGrath with his second top-ten best-seller peaking at number six on the charts. From 1990 to 2010 he released a number of books on personal development, including Happiness Principle (1989), Respect Yourself (1990), Journey into the Mind (1991),  Cosmic Executive (1992) and Getting Younger (2003). According to The Canberra Times reviewer, in Cosmic Executive, McGrath advised that "Australian companies are too regimented and obsessed with profit.
And he suggests employers give their workers fancy dress days and ice-cream hours to help improve
productivity."

Bibliography

References

1949 births
Australian music journalists
Living people
People from Mount Waverley, Victoria
Swinburne University of Technology alumni
Musicians from Melbourne
Journalists from Melbourne
Australian non-fiction writers
20th-century Australian male writers